Rigers Hoxha (born 3 September 1985 in Krujë) is an Albanian professional footballer who plays for Iliria Fushë-Krujë in the Albanian First Division.

Honours
Kastrioti Krujë
Albanian Superliga Playoffs (2): 2009, 2010

External links

 Profile - FSHF

1985 births
People from Krujë
Living people
Albanian footballers
Association football defenders
FK Dinamo Tirana players
KS Kastrioti players
KS Iliria players
Kategoria Superiore players
Kategoria e Parë players